Eucalyptus acaciiformis, commonly known as wattle-leaved peppermint is a tree growing to about  in height that is endemic to the Northern Tablelands of New South Wales. It has rough, fibrous bark, lance-shaped leaves, white flowers and cup-shaped to bell-shaped fruit. It grows in poor shallow soil, on ridges and slopes.

Description

Taxonomy and naming
Eucalyptus acaciiformis was first formally described in 1899 by Henry Deane and Joseph Maiden who published the description in Proceedings of the Linnean Society of New South Wales. The specific epithet (acaciiformis) refers to the similarity of the leaves of this species to some in the genus Acacia, the ending -formis being a Latin suffix meaning "shaped".

Distribution and habitat
Willow-leaved peppermint occurs on the northern tablelands north from Nowendoc and almost to the Queensland border. It grows in poor and shallow soils on slopes and ridges, mostly in woodland.

References

acaciiformis
Flora of New South Wales
Myrtales of Australia
Trees of Australia
Plants described in 1899
Taxa named by Henry Deane (engineer)
Taxa named by Joseph Maiden